This is the fourth edition of the Copa Bolivia, Jorge Wilstermann are the defending after beating 2-1 (On Aggregate) Blooming.  The format of the Copa Bolivia had change it is going to be only knockout in the 1st round team from third division qualified. The second round is for 2nd division, 3rd round for the 1st Division.

First round

Second round

Third round
 4 best loser from the 2nd round.

Fourth round

Quarter-final
 2 Best Loser

Semi-final

Final

Bol
Bol